Kalb el louz or Qalb ellouz (Arabic: قلب اللوز) is a traditional semolina based Algerian dessert.

Kelb el louz, which means “heart of almonds” is also known as chamia or h’rissa depending on the region, it is a traditional Algerian dessert. It is made with semolina, almonds, orange blossom and honey.

See also
• Algerian cuisine

References

Algerian cuisine